French house DJ and producer David Guetta has released seven studio albums, eleven compilation albums, three extended plays, ninety-two singles (including seven as a featured artist), eleven promotional singles, and forty-two music videos.

Guetta released his debut single "Nation Rap", a collaboration with French rapper Sidney, in 1990. His debut studio album, Just a Little More Love, was released in June 2002. It peaked at number six in France and was certified two times gold by the Syndicat National de l'Édition Phonographique (SNEP). Three of the album's singles attained commercial success in several European territories, including France and Belgium: "Just a Little More Love", "Love Don't Let Me Go" and "People Come People Go". Guetta Blaster, his second studio album, peaked at number 11 in France and produced four singles: "Money", "Stay", "The World Is Mine" and "In Love with Myself".

In 2006, a mash-up of "Love Don't Let Me Go" and "Walking Away" by British electronic music band The Egg was released, entitled "Love Don't Let Me Go (Walking Away)". It performed well in Europe, peaking at number three in the United Kingdom and becoming a top forty hit in several other European countries. June 2007 saw the release of Guetta's third studio album, Pop Life, which peaked at number two in France and was certified platinum by the SNEP. The album's lead single, "Love Is Gone", became a top ten hit in countries such as France, Sweden and the United Kingdom. It also gave Guetta his first chart entry on the United States Billboard Hot 100, where it peaked at number 98. Pop Life produced an additional four singles: "Baby When the Light", "Delirious "featuring UK singer/songwriter Tara McDonald, "Tomorrow Can Wait" and "Everytime We Touch".

Guetta attained international success with his 2009 hit single "When Love Takes Over", which topped the charts in countries such as Belgium, Switzerland and the United Kingdom. It was followed by the single "Sexy Bitch", which topped the charts in eight different countries and gave Guetta his first top five hit on the Billboard Hot 100. Both singles were included on Guetta's fourth studio album, One Love, released in August 2009. Fueled by the success of the singles, One Love peaked at number one in France and reached the top ten in several other countries, including Australia and the United Kingdom.

Five more singles were released from the album, including the hit singles "One Love", "Memories", "Gettin' Over You" and "Who's That Chick?". In 2011, Guetta collaborated with American rapper Snoop Dogg for a remix of the latter's single "Wet", newly titled "Sweat". It topped the charts in countries such as France, Australia and Austria. Guetta released his fifth studio album, Nothing but the Beat, in August 2011. The album was a commercial success, topping the charts in France and numerous other countries. The album's first five singles—"Where Them Girls At", "Little Bad Girl", "Without You", "Titanium" and "Turn Me On"—all became top ten hits worldwide. The latter three singles also became top ten hits on the Billboard Hot 100. The follow-up singles "I Can Only Imagine", "She Wolf (Falling to Pieces)" and "Just One Last Time" also experienced commercial success.

Albums

Studio albums

Studio album reissues

Compilation albums

Box sets

Extended plays

Singles

As lead artist

1990s

2000s

2010s

2020s

As Jack Back

As featured artist

Promotional singles

Other charted songs

Guest appearances

Music videos

As lead artist

As featured artist

Guest appearances

Notes

References

External links
 Official website
 David Guetta at AllMusic
 
 

Discographies of French artists
Electronic music discographies